Eslah-e Boz-e Korki Animal Husbandry Station ( – Istgāh-e Eşlāḩ-e Nezhād va Parvaresh-e Boz-e Korkī) is a village in Bezenjan Rural District, in the Central District of Baft County, Kerman Province, Iran. At the 2006 census, its population was 36, in 6 families.

References 

Populated places in Baft County